This is a list of the High Sheriffs of the English county of Northumberland.
The High Sheriff is the oldest secular office under the Crown. Formerly the High Sheriff was the principal law enforcement officer in the county but over the centuries most of the responsibilities associated with the post have been transferred elsewhere or are now defunct, so that its functions are now largely ceremonial. The High Sheriff changes every March.

11th century
 1076–1080 Gilebert
 1085–1095 Arkell Morel, supposed slayer of Malcolm Canmore, King of Scots at the Battle of Alnwick.

12th century
 1107–1118 Joint Ligulf and Aluric
 1119–1132 Odard
 1133–1150 Adam son of Odard
 1154 Odard
 1155–1170 William de Vesci, Lord of Alnwick
 1171–1184 Roger de Stuteville
 1185–1188 Roger de Glanville
 1189 William de Stuteville
 1190 William de Stuteville and Reginald Basset
 1191–1193 William de Stuteville
 1194–1199 Hugh Bardulf

13th century

14th century

15th century

16th century

17th century

18th century

19th century

20th century

21st century

References

  The history of the worthies of England, Volume 2 By Thomas Fuller
 The Sheriffs of Northumberland by C H Hunter Blair – Archaeologia Aeliana: Or, Miscellaneous Tracts Relating to Antiquities Published 1843 

 
Northumberland
Local government in Northumberland
History of Northumberland
Northumberland-related lists